The Old Little Rock Central Fire Station is a historic firehouse, next to Little Rock City Hall at 520 West Markham Street in downtown Little Rock, Arkansas.  It is, from its front, a Beaux Arts two-story masonry building, designed by Charles L. Thompson and built in 1913.  The front facade is dominated by the former equipment bays, which are separated by fluted columns, and topped by an elaborate architrave.  The building is now used for other purposes by the city.

The building was listed on the National Register of Historic Places in 1979.

See also
National Register of Historic Places listings in Little Rock, Arkansas

References

Beaux-Arts architecture in Arkansas
Fire stations completed in 1913
National Register of Historic Places in Little Rock, Arkansas
Fire stations on the National Register of Historic Places in Arkansas
1913 establishments in Arkansas
Government of Little Rock, Arkansas